Midnight Memories is the third studio album by English-Irish boy band One Direction, released on 25 November 2013 by Columbia Records, Syco Music and Sony Music. It was described as having a "slightly rockier tone" than their previous efforts. The album became the fastest-selling album in Amazon UK history, breaking the record set by their previous release, Take Me Home (2012). It debuted at number one on the US Billboard 200, making One Direction the first group in history to debut at number one in the US with their first three albums. Despite being released five weeks before the year's end, Midnight Memories nevertheless became the best-selling album of 2013 as listed by the IFPI, with sales of four million copies. The album was supported by four singles "Best Song Ever" "Story of My Life", the album's title track, and "You & I".

Upon the album's release, Midnight Memories received mixed reviews from music critics. Many critics praised the lyrical depth and musical composition on the album, as well as the group's level of involvement in the production process. However, others argued that the material was less memorable than their previous work and felt the themes were not as mature as expected. To promote the album, One Direction embarked on their third and first stadium concert tour, entitled the Where We Are Tour in 2014.

Background and development
One Direction began working on their third studio album whilst embarking on their second international tour, the Take Me Home Tour. The album was announced simultaneously with the news of the band's third world tour, the Where We Are Tour, which subsequently led fans to wrongly assume that the album would be named "Where We Are". Member Louis Tomlinson proclaimed that the album would have a "rockier" sound to it than the band's previous releases. The official title of the album was announced on 6 September 2013, starting with Zayn Malik tweeting a teaser video of Harry Styles spelling out the word "Mid" out of a pile of alphabet cards on the floor, followed by a full video posted on the band's Instagram account later on, revealing the title, Midnight Memories.

The album artwork was released early exclusively by The Sun via a tweet which was then confirmed to be the official artwork through the band's official Twitter account, though the early access was only available for those who held a membership of the newspaper's online version. On 11 October, the band presented the album's final track list through the "#MidnightMemoriesTrackQuiz" hashtag on Twitter by giving out a mixture of hints and blank spaces to be filled alongside the final result. The full track list for the deluxe edition was later shown on iTunes. The album later leaked one week prior to its release.

Singles

"Best Song Ever" was released on 22 July 2013 as the official lead single from the album. The track peaked at number two on the UK Singles Chart. Its music video beat the Vevo record for most viewers within 24 hours on YouTube, clocking in at 12.3 million views, beating the previous record set by Miley Cyrus for "We Can't Stop", which held 10.7 million views in 24 hours.

"Story of My Life" was released on 28 October 2013 as the second single from the album. The track premiered on 25 October 2013, playing at 16:00 GST on radio stations across the world and debuted at number four on the UK Singles Chart, despite holding the number one position on the midweek chart and continuing to lead until Saturday of that week. The song eventually peaked at number 2. The video was released on 3 November 2013.

"Midnight Memories", was announced as the third single from the album on 24 January 2014.

"You & I" was serviced to US radio on 15 April 2014 as the album's fourth and final single.

Promotional singles
 "Diana" was the first promotional single. It charted in the Irish top 10 on 21 November 2013, and at number two on the New Zealand Singles Chart on 22 November 2013.
  "Strong" debuted at number one on the New Zealand Singles Chart on 29 November 2013, four days after the album's release.

Other songs
 "One Way or Another" was released on 17 February 2013 as the official 2013 Comic Relief single, peaking at number one on the UK Singles Chart and achieving success around the world.

All song except "Something Great" have charted on the UK Singles Chart.

Critical reception

Upon its release, Midnight Memories received mixed reviews from music critics and publications. At Metacritic, which assigns a normalized rating out of 100 to reviews from mainstream publications, the album received an average score of 59, based on 15 reviews, indicating "mixed or average reviews".

Brian Mansfield from USA Today awarded it three stars out of four, saying "Midnight uses classic rock as a color the way last year's Take Me Home used electronic dance music." Kitty Empire of The Guardian commented that "after two albums of flirting, hand-holding and coltish fumbling at parties, One Direction might just have finally gone all the way on their third album" and that "this album does the job, in more ways than one" while commenting specifically of the new maturity of the group and the "rockier" sound. Tim Sendra from AllMusic gave the album 4 stars out of 5, saying that "anyone expecting there to be any kind of drop in quality, or early warnings that the group had begun their inevitable decline, will be happily surprised that not only does the album satisfy the established quota of thrilling modern pop tracks and uplifting ballads, but also introduces some interesting new directions". He praised the bold decision to evolve the band's sound, and its results, concluding that the record "ends up as another satisfying album that does everything a One D album should do and then some."

Chris Payne of Billboard wrote that the album "follows up on what worked best on last year's Take Me Home and tosses in some proficient new ideas to keep listeners eager for the band's continued evolution" while noting the new prominence of the guitar in the songs. Writing with USA Today, Brian Mansfield complimented the songwriting of Tomlinson and Payne while noting the "elements of power pop in the shouted choruses of the riffy title track and the trebly guitar chords" while adding "the best songs here ... suggest the group's finest memories may still lie ahead". Sam Lansky of Idolator complimented the album, calling it "one of the sturdier pop releases in recent memory" and commenting they One Direction "have proven themselves to be a surprisingly reliable pop act, and here, as ever, the choruses soar marvelously, the harmonies are pleasing, the production is taut and the songcraft is beyond reproach".

Annie Zaleski of The A.V. Club said the album "isn’t a genre game-changer" but that "there’s enough personality, charm, and dramatic solos to satisfy fans, and enough incremental moves toward artistic credibility to at least give the band a chance at an enduring career". Eric Henderson of Slant Magazine noted that the group "tossed aside the wilted tissues of their adolescent pop trifles in favor of protein-blasted rock anthems and mountain-man acoustic ballads" while also commenting on the '80s rock sound. Writing with Spin, Alfred Soto deemed Midnight Memories "the best boy-band album since No Strings Attached while complimenting the "inspired juxtapositions like early-’60s twang guitar and parade-ground beats".

However, some were less enthusiastic. Many critics argued the absence of their previous work, deeming it "not special" and "forgettable" and some felt it was too mature for their core audience and didn't come off as mature as expected through their themes. Rob Tannebaum of Rolling Stone gave a mixed review, commenting that "they joyfully plunder rock riffs and hip-hop beats, but a logjam of lousy ballads suggests Bryan Adams embodies their ideal of maturity". Jim Farber from Daily News gave it three stars out of five, arguing that most of the songs "sounds much like any goo from the guys". Speaking of the musical style of the album, he stated that although "there probably are just enough newbies to extend the band's brand for this small window before the next thing comes along," he believed the group presented an image too mature for their core audience, saying "One Direction must reconcile this range with their own growth spurts," and describing the grown-up appearance of the band members since their debut single as "a big change in just three years". Andy Gill of The Independent called the album "a clumsy attempt at rock".

Commercial performance
The album debuted at number one on the Irish Albums Chart and number two on the Dutch Albums Chart. On 29 November 2013, it was announced that it had become the fastest-selling album of 2013 in the UK, with 187,660 copies sold in four days. It was revealed on 1 December 2013, that the album had sold in excess of 237,000 copies in its first week in the UK, beating Gary Barlow's Since I Saw You Last, and becoming the fastest selling album in the UK since Michael Bublé's Christmas in December 2011, as well as outperforming One Direction's two previous albums Up All Night (2011) and Take Me Home (2012). It became the best-selling album of 2013 in the UK with 685,000 copies sold for the year.

In the United States, Midnight Memories debuted at number one on the Billboard 200 with 546,000 copies sold in its first week. This made One Direction the first group in Billboard 200 history to debut at No. 1 with its first three albums, and the first to reach No. 1 with its first three albums since 1967.  The album sold 1,096,000 copies in five weeks in the United States, making it the twelfth best-selling album of 2013 in the United States. As of August 2015, it has sold over 1.51 million copies in the U.S.

Midnight Memories also debuted at numbers one and two on the ARIA Albums Chart and the New Zealand Albums Chart, and was certified Platinum and Gold, respectively, in its first week. The album went on to sell over 60,000 copies in Mexico after only three days, being certified Platinum.

Despite being released towards the year's end, Midnight Memories nevertheless became the best-selling album of 2013 worldwide according to the IFPI, with sales of over four million copies in only 5 weeks.

Track listing
The track listing was announced via the band's Twitter account on 11 October 2013. Where the bonus tracks appear as additional tracks in international territories, the British release finds them on a separate four-track bonus disc. Unlike any other release of the album, the Japanese version includes "One Way or Another (Teenage Kicks)", as well as two further bonus tracks.

Notes
  signifies a vocal producer
  signifies an additional vocal producer
  signifies an additional producer
  signifies a co-producer

Personnel
Credits taken from Midnight Memories liner notes.

R.J. Shaughnessy - photography
Calvin Aurand - photography
Fluidesign - design
Tom Coyne - mastering at Sterling Sound

Charts

Weekly charts

Monthly charts

Year-end charts

Decade-end charts

Certifications and sales

Release history

References

One Direction albums
Columbia Records albums
2013 albums
Albums produced by Ryan Tedder
Albums produced by John Shanks
Albums produced by Jacknife Lee
Syco Music albums